Lesiba Ezekiel Molala is a South African politician who was elected to the National Assembly of South Africa in the 2019 general election as a member of the African National Congress.

Since becoming an MP, Molala has served on the Portfolio Committee on Communications.

References

External links
Profile at Parliament of South Africa

Living people
Year of birth missing (living people)
Place of birth missing (living people)
Tswana people
Members of the National Assembly of South Africa
African National Congress politicians